Raymond Earl Rhodes (born October 20, 1950) is a former American football player and coach. Rhodes played wide receiver and cornerback for the New York Giants and the San Francisco 49ers. He served as the head coach of the Philadelphia Eagles and the Green Bay Packers of the National Football League (NFL), as well as the former assistant defensive backs coach of the Houston Texans. He earned five Super Bowl rings as an assistant coach with the San Francisco 49ers, and was named Coach of the Year by the Associated Press in 1995, his first season as Eagles head coach. He last served as the senior defensive assistant for the Cleveland Browns.

Playing career

High school
Born and raised in Mexia, Texas, Rhodes graduated from Mexia High School in 1969, and was a letterman in football, basketball, and track and field.  He transferred from crosstown Dunbar High School after his sophomore year.

College
Rhodes was a running back at Texas Christian University in Fort Worth for two seasons, then transferred to the University of Tulsa, where he played wide receiver and cornerback.

NFL
Rhodes was selected by the New York Giants in the tenth round of the 1974 NFL draft, 236th overall. He spent his first three years in the NFL as a wide receiver before switching to cornerback. In 1979, he was traded to the San Francisco 49ers for Tony Dungy, another future head coach. He retired after one season with the 49ers.

Coaching career

NFL

Assistant coach
Rhodes remained with the 49ers as an assistant secondary coach before becoming defensive backs coach. He won four Super Bowls with a group that included Ronnie Lott, Eric Wright, and Dwight Hicks. After serving that position for many years, he was hired by former colleague Mike Holmgren to be the new defensive coordinator for the Green Bay Packers. After two years Rhodes returned to San Francisco as the defensive coordinator of their 1994 Super Bowl-winning team.

Following his head coaching jobs, Rhodes served as the defensive coordinator for the Washington Redskins and the Denver Broncos. After the 2002 season, Rhodes was reunited with Holmgren when he became the defensive coordinator for the Seattle Seahawks, where he remained through the 2007 season.

In September 2005, Rhodes was hospitalized for dizziness and tests later revealed that he had suffered from a mild stroke. Early Monday October 2, 2006, the Seahawks charter flight had to make an emergency landing in Rapid City, South Dakota to get precautionary medical care for Rhodes.  The Seahawks were flying home from a loss at the Chicago Bears.

On January 28, 2008, Ray Rhodes joined his sixth NFL organization when he was hired by the Houston Texans as an assistant defensive backs coach.

Head coach

Philadelphia Eagles
On February 2, 1995, five days after the 49ers won Super Bowl XXIX, Ray Rhodes was named head coach of the Philadelphia Eagles, becoming the fourth African-American head coach in NFL history behind Fritz Pollard, Art Shell and Dennis Green. Rhodes gained notoriety for his no-nonsense approach and unusual ways of motivating his players. One such tactic was an analogy "comparing the feeling of a loss to someone breaking into (one's) home and sodomizing (one's) horses and kids."

In Rhodes's first season, he received the NFL Coach of the Year Award as the Eagles overcame a 1–3 start to finish 10–6 and qualify for the playoffs as a wild card. Despite playing the first-round game at home, the Eagles were an underdog to the Detroit Lions, whose starting left tackle, Lomas Brown, guaranteed an easy win. Using this perceived lack of respect as a rallying cry, Philadelphia dismantled Detroit, 58–37, at one point leading the game by a 51–7 score. Rhodes said after the victory that the only things guaranteed in life are "death and taxes." Though the Eagles were eliminated by the Dallas Cowboys the following week, the 1995 season was considered an enormous success.

In 1996, the Eagles again finished 10–6, but struggled down the stretch after an impressive 7–2 start. Once again, Philadelphia reached the playoffs as a wild card, traveling to San Francisco to face the 49ers, Rhodes's former team. At a rain-soaked 3Com Park, the Eagles, who boasted the top-ranked offense in the NFC during the regular season, were shut out, 14–0.

During training camp in 1997, Rhodes remarked that season's Eagles team was his most talented one to date. Despite the optimism, Philadelphia started 1–3, and never quite recovered, stumbling to a disappointing 6–9–1 record, including an 0–7–1 mark on the road. As the team struggled through the season, it was widely speculated that players had grown weary of Rhodes's fiery approach and were tuning him out.

The 1998 season proved to be a disaster. A listless Eagles team finished 3–13, setting a franchise record for losses in a season. For the second straight season, Philadelphia did not win a road game, going 0–8 away from home. The offense, which ranked first in the NFC two years earlier, finished dead last in the NFL. The Eagles were shut out three times and scored only 161 total points. On December 28, one day after the season's final game, Rhodes was fired as Philadelphia's head coach. In four seasons as the Eagles' head coach, Rhodes compiled a 29–34–1 record in the regular season and a 1–2 record in the playoffs.

Green Bay Packers
The Green Bay Packers were looking for a new coach after Mike Holmgren had left to become head coach and general manager of the Seattle Seahawks. Green Bay GM Ron Wolf was a fan of Rhodes's coaching style. On January 11, 1999, Rhodes was hired to coach the Packers after being the only candidate to interview for the position.

Rhodes's tenure as head coach lasted only one season. The Packers finished 8–8, their only non-winning season between 1992 and 2004. Green Bay missed the playoffs for the first time since 1992, based on a tiebreaker system (Detroit and Dallas reached the playoffs with 8–8 records, while Green Bay and the Carolina Panthers did not).  Rhodes, a former NFL Coach of the Year, spent the 1999 season under heavy scrutiny by the Wisconsin sports media, beginning with accusations of underachieving, and highlighted by objection to his use of replay to overrule a go-ahead 4th-quarter touchdown by the opposing Carolina Panthers along with failing to call time out with less than a minute remaining with Carolina driving down the field. The criticism of this decision was also echoed by ESPN's Paul Maguire.  On January 3, 2000, Rhodes was fired by the Packers, and subsequently replaced by Mike Sherman.

Head coaching record

Personal life
Rhodes and his wife, Carmen have four daughters.

While in Philadelphia, Rhodes spent a lot of time enjoying his favorite hobby, horse racing. He appeared regularly on Courier-Posts "Dusty Nathan's Winner's Circle" radio show.
Additionally, Rhodes had his own TV and radio shows in the Philadelphia market before moving to the Green Bay Packers in 1999 and deciding to end his foray into on-air media talent.

In September 2005, Rhodes suffered a stroke while at his suburban Seattle home. During the 2006 season, Rhodes suffered from stroke-like symptoms while on the Seahawks' team flight home from a game at Chicago; the plane made an emergency landing in South Dakota due to the incident.

References

External links

1950 births
Living people
American football cornerbacks
American football wide receivers
Denver Broncos coaches
Green Bay Packers head coaches
Houston Texans coaches
New York Giants players
Philadelphia Eagles head coaches
San Francisco 49ers coaches
San Francisco 49ers players
Seattle Seahawks coaches
TCU Horned Frogs football players
Tulsa Golden Hurricane football players
Washington Redskins coaches
National Football League defensive coordinators
People from Mexia, Texas
Players of American football from Texas
African-American coaches of American football
African-American players of American football
21st-century African-American people
20th-century African-American sportspeople